In set theory, a branch of mathematics, the axiom of uniformization is a weak form of the axiom of choice.
 

A uniformization of  then picks exactly one element from each such subset, whenever the subset is non-empty. Thus, allowing arbitrary sets X and Y (rather than just Polish spaces) would make the axiom of uniformization equivalent to the axiom of choice. 

The uniformization property is implied by the scale property, at least for adequate pointclasses of a certain form.

It follows from ZFC alone that  and  have the uniformization property. It follows from the existence of sufficient large cardinals that
 and  have the uniformization property for every natural number .
Therefore, the collection of projective sets has the uniformization property.
Every relation in L(R) can be uniformized, but not necessarily by a function in L(R). In fact, L(R) does not have the uniformization property (equivalently, L(R) does not satisfy the axiom of uniformization).
(Note: it's trivial that every relation in L(R) can be uniformized in V, assuming V satisfies the axiom of choice. The point is that every such relation can be uniformized in some transitive inner model of V in which the axiom of determinacy holds.)

References 

 

Set theory
Descriptive set theory
Axiom of choice